David Bosa (born 28 April 1992) is an Italian speed skater.

Bosa competed at the 2014 Winter Olympics for Italy. In the 500 metres he finished 31st overall.

As of September 2014, Bosa's best performance at the World Sprint Speed Skating Championships, was 20th at the 2014 event.

Bosa made his World Cup debut in January 2013. As of September 2014, Bosa's top World Cup finish is 16th in a 500m race at Heerenveen in 2013–14. His best overall finish in the World Cup is 31st, in the 500 metres in 2013–14.

References

External links
 

1992 births
Living people
Italian male speed skaters
Speed skaters at the 2014 Winter Olympics
Speed skaters at the 2022 Winter Olympics
Olympic speed skaters of Italy
Sportspeople from Trento
Speed skaters of Fiamme Oro
20th-century Italian people
21st-century Italian people